Gumerovo is the name of several rural localities in the Republic of Bashkortostan, Russia:
Gumerovo, Aurgazinsky District, Republic of Bashkortostan, a village in Tashtamaksky Selsoviet of Aurgazinsky District
Gumerovo, Baymaksky District, Republic of Bashkortostan, a village in Yaratovsky Selsoviet of Baymaksky District
Gumerovo, Blagoveshchensky District, Republic of Bashkortostan, a village in Ilikovsky Selsoviet of Blagoveshchensky District
Gumerovo, Burayevsky District, Republic of Bashkortostan, a village in Azyakovsky Selsoviet of Burayevsky District
Gumerovo, Davlekanovsky District, Republic of Bashkortostan, a village in Kadyrgulovsky Selsoviet of Davlekanovsky District
Gumerovo, Ishimbaysky District, Republic of Bashkortostan, a village in Petrovsky Selsoviet of Ishimbaysky District
Gumerovo, Kushnarenkovsky District, Republic of Bashkortostan, a village in Gorkovsky Selsoviet of Kushnarenkovsky District
Gumerovo, Mechetlinsky District, Republic of Bashkortostan, a village in Duvan-Mechetlinsky Selsoviet of Mechetlinsky District